The University of California operates the largest academic library system in the world.  It manages more than 40.8 million print volumes in 100 libraries on ten campuses.  The purpose of these libraries is to assist research and instruction on the University of California campuses. While each campus library is separate, they share (through the UC library system) facilities for storage, computerized indexing, digital libraries and management.

Historically, each campus maintained its own library catalog and simultaneously participated in the systemwide union catalog, Melvyl.  On July 27, 2021, all ten campuses went live with UC Library Search, a unified systemwide library catalog based on the Ex Libris Alma/Primo platform.

The UC libraries also manage a digital library, the California Digital Library or CDL. They also hold special collections and electronic archives of research documents.  Special collections include historical archives on California history, federal depositories, law libraries, specialized collections for medical and scientific research, and a series of periodicals.

A major concern of the library system is the rising cost of scientific journal subscriptions, and the costs of renting article databases.  The library is leading an effort to publish science research online in a persistently-available electronic format, primarily through a digital repository called the eScholarship repository.

The physical collections are scattered across the UC campuses. Their collections and stand-alone library buildings are listed below.

In the 1980s, to relieve overcrowding in existing on-campus library buildings, the UC system constructed two regional library facilities: the Northern Regional Library Facility at UC Berkeley's Richmond Field Station (opened 1982), and the Southern Regional Library Facility on the western edge of the UCLA campus (opened 1987).  As of 2019, Northern Regional Library Facility is home to 7.4 million volumes, while Southern Regional Library Facility is home to 6.5 million.  Each facility receives items from all UC campuses in its respective region of the state, and has climate controls and high-density stacks. Items are shelved two deep and are arranged in a sequence that results in efficient use of space (but is not quite as intuitive as traditional library indexing systems).  As a result, casual browsing is prohibited, and the shelves are accessible only by library clerks trained to retrieve and put back items properly.  Users must page materials to an on-site reading room or to a library at their home campus.

List of collections by campus

Berkeley (18 university libraries and 11 affiliated libraries—including Law)

Doe Memorial Library (Main Collections and Main Stacks)
Moffitt Library (Undergraduate)
Bancroft Library (Special Collections)
Hargrove Music Library

Davis (11 major libraries—including Law and Medical)
Peter J. Shields Library (Main Collections)
Physical Sciences and Engineering Library
Blaisdell Medical Library (Sacramento)
Carlson Health Science Library (Davis)
Mabie Law Library (Davis)

Irvine (4 major libraries—including Medical)

Langson Library (Main Collections)
Science Library (Science and Biomedical Fields)
Grunigen Medical Library (Medical)
Law Library 
Gateway Study Center

Los Angeles (13 major libraries—including Law and Medical)

American Indian Studies Center Library
Arts Library
Asian American Studies Center Library/Reading Room
Charles E. Young Research Library (Humanities and Social Sciences)
Chicano Studies Research Center Library
Ethnomusciology Archive
Eugene and Maxine Rosenfeld Management Library
Gonda Elementary Library (Library of affiliated elementary school, UCLA Lab School)
Grace M. Hunt Memorial English Reading Room
Hugh & Hazel Darling Law Library
Powell Library (Undergraduate Collections)
Louise M. Darling Biomedical Library
Library Special Collections
Music Library
Ralph J. Bunche Center for African American Studies Library and Media Center
Richard C. Rudolph East Asian Library
Science and Engineering Library
Social Science Data Archive
UCLA Film and Television Archive
William Andrews Clark Memorial Library

Merced
Kolligian Library (Main Collections)

Riverside

Tomas Rivera Library (Main Collections)
Orbach Science Library (Science Fields)

San Diego (7 major libraries—including Medical)

Geisel Library (Main Collections)
Biomedical Library

San Francisco

Parnassus Campus Library (Health Sciences - Main)
Mission Bay FAMRI Library (Health Sciences)

Santa Barbara

Davidson Library

UCSB Music Library

Santa Cruz

McHenry Library
Humanities and Social Sciences
David Kirk Digital Scholarship Commons
Special Collections and Archives
Dead Central archives of the Grateful Dead
Science & Engineering Library
Jean and Bill Lane Botanical Library
Page Smith Library, Cowell College
Adlai E. Stevenson College Library  
Merrill College Library  
Crown College Library  
Oakes College Library

Policies

The UC library system has open stacks at most libraries, and permits free research and reading by the public. In addition, all campuses allow any California resident to apply for a library card and thus gain limited borrowing privileges for libraries on that campus, although there is typically a charge for these cards.

Materials may be borrowed between the UC campus libraries or from the regional library facilities through interlibrary loan; it is generally possible for a student or other university associate to order a nonfragile, unreserved item and have it within a few days. Books may take between a day to a week to be delivered between campuses.

Librarians Association of the University of California

The Librarians Association of the University of California (LAUC) is the statewide organization of librarians employed at least half-time in the UC Library system. Each campus also supports its own division. Librarians are academic appointees but not faculty. LAUC's objectives are to: advise the university on professional and governance matters, to make recommendations concerning UC librarians’ rights, privileges, and obligations, and to promote full utilization of UC librarians’ professional abilities. LAUC also awards research grants to its members to support librarian research and professional development.

References

External links
The University of California Libraries
The Melvyl Catalog
the California Digital Library
the eScholarship repository
Librarians Association of the University of California

University and college academic libraries in the United States